Sohan is a village and Union Council situated in Islamabad Capital Territory of Pakistan . The first Union Council Chairman of this village was Malik Khuadad Khan. Who was a very well known person of his area and a very well known farmer geographical coordinates are 33° 39' 0" North, 73° 6' 0" East and its original name (with diacritics) is Sohan. It is a place where mostly livestock farms are situated, such as  BizWhiz Livestock Private Limited Farms.

References

Union councils of Islamabad Capital Territory
Villages in Islamabad Capital Territory